The Casablanca directive was approved by the Combined Chiefs of Staff (CCOS) of the Western Allies at their 65th meeting on 21 January 1943 and issued to the appropriate Royal Air Force and United States Army Air Forces commanders on 4 February 1943. It remained in force until 17 April 1944, when the Allied strategic bomber commands based in Britain were directed to help with preparations for Operation Overlord.

The CCOS met during the Casablanca Conference when the Allies were deciding the future strategy of the war.

The directive set out a series of priorities for the strategic bombing of Germany by the air forces based in the UK (RAF Bomber Command and US Eighth Air Force). With modification in June, making German fighters (part of their main defence against Allied bombers) an "intermediate target " and the primary goal, it gave direction to the combined (USAAF and RAF) bombing offensive known as Operation Pointblank.

Contents
Memorandum C.C.S. 166/1/D by the Combined Chiefs of Staff, 21 January 1943:

C.C.S. 166/1/D was a revised and expanded version of the "C.C.S 166" document which had been presented for discussion to the Combined Chiefs of Staff on 20 January by the British Chiefs of Staff. The discussions brought up several issues, such as how to phrase the memorandum to balance the concerns of the different stake-holders about the priority to give to anti-U-boat activities as opposed to support for the planned operations to take place in the Mediterranean theatre. Two changes were proposed and agreed that the addition "for political reasons" should be inserted into  "... issued from time to time [for political reasons] by His Majesty's Government ..." and that the word "synthetic" was removed "Synthetic oil plants". Further changes were made to the British draft of the memorandum in the ordering of some of the sentences.

A modified version of the Casablanca directive as sent to RAF Bomber Command on 4 February 1943:

Arthur "Bomber" Harris, the commander of RAF Bomber Command from 1942, included the directive in his papers (published in 1995 as ) with an attached note to the bottom.

The RAF Bomber command version contains most of the information that is in the C.C.S. memorandum but in a different order and in the note at the bottom it makes it clear that this directive replaced general directive No. 5, that is often referred to as the Area Bombing Directive. Missing from the Bomber command directive are mention of "point 4" in the C.C.S. version – objectives of great but fleeting importance such as the German Fleet – and point 7 which was redundant as RAF Bomber Command already obeyed orders originating from the Chiefs of Staff Committee (British Chiefs of Staff) whatever their military or political origins.

In his post war book Bomber offensive Harris mentions the Casablanca directive at the start of chapter seven "The offensive underway". In it he emphasises the "Object" paragraph of the directive issued to the RAF and mentions the "Primary" paragraph in passing. He explains that the subject of morale had been dropped (it had been emphasised in the previous general directive No. 5 (the Area Bombing Directive)) and that he was to proceed with the "general 'disorganisation' of German industry" but that some parts of that industry, such as U-boat building, had a higher priority than others, from which he drew the conclusion that it "allowed [him] to attack any German industrial city of 100,000 inhabitants and above" and that the Ruhr remained the principal target for the RAF.

Notes

References
 
Churchill, Winston. The Second World War. Vol.5: Closing the Ring, Houghton Mifflin Books, 1986 
Harris, Arthur Travers; ed Cox, Sebastian (1995). Despatch on War Operations: 23 February 1942, to 8 May 1945, Routledge, .
Harris, Arthur Travers (2005). Bomber Offensive, London: Pen & Sword Military Classics (first published 1947), .
United States Department of State / Foreign relations of the United States. The Conferences at Washington, 1941–1942, and Casablanca, 1943 (1941–1943). III. The Casablanca Conference, pp. 485–849

Further reading
Delleman Paul. LeMay and Harris the "Objective" Exemplified Air & Space Power Journal Chronicles Online Journal. Accessed 14 July 2008.
Lambourne, Nicola  "War Damage in Western Europe", Edinburgh University Press, 2000,  p. 140
Wolk, Herman S. Decision at Casablanca Air Force Magazine online, January 2003, Vol. 86, No. 1
Wise S. F.; Greenhous, Brereton; Douglas, W. A. B. The Official History of the Royal Canadian Air Force, Department of National Defence, Government Publishing Centre, Canada Supply and Services Canada, Department of National Defence, Canada, . p. 657

Aerial bombing
Aerial warfare strategy
1943 documents
World War II aerial operations and battles of the Western European Theatre